2013 Australian Labor Party leadership spill may refer to:
*March 2013 Australian Labor Party leadership spill
June 2013 Australian Labor Party leadership spill
October 2013 Australian Labor Party leadership spill